Manara may refer to:

Places
 Manara, Israel, a kibbutz in Upper Gallilee adjacent to the Lebanese border
 Manara, Lebanon, a municipality in the Beqaa Governorate near the Syrian border
 Manara, Nepal
 Manara, Ohio, United States
 Al Manara, Dubai, United Arab Emirates
 Al-Manara, Palestine, a depopulated Palestinian village near Tiberias

Buildings
 Al Manara Stadium, a stadium in Manara, Beirut
 Al Manara Tower, a tower on Sheikh Zayed Road in Dubai, United Arab Emirates
 Al Manara (tower), a tower in Business Bay in Dubai, United Arab Emirates

Other uses
 Manara (Nord) River - a river in Northern Madagascar.
 Manara (film), a 2018 Lebanese short film
 5092 Manara, a main belt asteroid named after Alessandro Manara
 Il commissario Manara, an Italian television crime series
 Minaret, known as manara (منارة, but more usually  مئذنة) in Arabic

People with the surname Manara
 Achille Manara (1827–1906), Italian cardinal 
 Luciano Manara (1825–1849), Italian soldier
 Milo Manara (born 1945), Italian comic book creator
  (1627–1679), Spanish Jesuit brother who helped build Santa Caridad de Sevilla Hospital; see

See also
 Mananara River (Analanjirofo), a river in Northern Madagascar

Italian-language surnames